Covenanters were members of a 17th-century Scottish religious and political movement, who supported a Presbyterian Church of Scotland and the primacy of its leaders in religious affairs. The name is derived from covenant, a biblical term for a bond or agreement with God.

The origins of the movement lay in disputes with James VI and his son Charles I over church structure and doctrine. In 1638, thousands of Scots signed the National Covenant, pledging to resist changes imposed by Charles on the kirk; following victory in the 1639 and 1640 Bishops' Wars, the Covenanters took control of Scotland, and the 1643 Solemn League and Covenant brought them into the First English Civil War on the side of parliament. After his defeat in May 1646, Charles I surrendered to the Scots Covenanters, rather than parliament. By doing so, he hoped to exploit divisions between Presbyterians, and English Independents. 

As a result, the Scots supported Charles in the 1648 Second English Civil War. After the king's execution in 1649, the Covenanter government, in order to protect the Presbyterian polity and Calvinist doctrine of the Church of Scotland, signed the Treaty of Breda (1650) restoring Charles' son to the Scottish throne and supporting him against the English parliamentary forces as Charles II. Charles II was crowned King of Scots in Scone in January 1651, but by then the terms agreed at Breda were already a dead letter. The army associated with the kirk party under David Leslie, 1st Lord Newark was destroyed by Oliver Cromwell at the Battle of Dunbar in September 1650, while the English parliamentarian New Model Army had taken Edinburgh and much of Lowland Scotland. The resulting annexation of Scotland by the Commonwealth of England abolished Scotland's legislative institutions and disestablished Presbyterianism. There was freedom of religion under the Commonwealth, except for Roman Catholics, but the edicts of the kirk's assemblies were no longer enforced by law. 

At his restoration in 1660  the king reneged on the terms of the treaty and his oath of covenant; the Scottish Covenanters saw this as a betrayal. The Rescissory Act 1661 repealed all laws made since 1633, effectively ejecting 400 ministers from their livings, restoring patronage in the appointment of ministers to congregations and allowing the king to proclaim the restoration of bishops to the Church of Scotland. The Abjuration Act of 1662 was a formal rejection of the National Covenant of 1638 and the Solemn League and Covenant of 1643. These were declared to be against the fundamental laws of the kingdom. The act required all persons taking public office to take the Oath of Abjuration not to take arms against the king and reject the Covenants. This excluded most Presbyterians from holding official positions of trust.

The resulting disappointment with Charles II's religious policy became civil unrest and erupted in violence during the early summer of 1679 with the assassination of Archbishop Sharp and the Battles of Drumclog and Bothwell Bridge. The Sanquhar Declaration of 1680 effectively declared the people could not accept the authority of a king who would neither commit to his previous oaths nor recognise their religion. In February 1685, the king died and was succeeded by his Roman Catholic brother, the Duke of York, as King James VII. 

After the 1660 Restoration, the Covenanters lost control of the kirk and became a persecuted minority, leading to several armed rebellions and a period from 1679 to 1688 known as "The Killing Time". Following the 1688 Glorious Revolution in Scotland, the Church of Scotland was re-established as a wholly Presbyterian structure and most Covenanters readmitted. This marked the end of their existence as a significant movement, although dissident minorities persisted in Scotland, Ireland and North America. These exist today as the Reformed Presbyterian communion of churches.

Background

In the mid-16th century, John Knox and other converts from Catholicism founded a reformed Church of Scotland, or kirk, Presbyterian in structure, and Calvinist in doctrine. Members committed to maintain the kirk as the sole form of religion in Scotland, under a Godly bond, or 'Covenant', the first of which was signed by the Lords of the Congregation in December 1557. In 1560, the Parliament of Scotland adopted the Scots Confession, largely written in four days by Knox, which rejected many Catholic teachings and practices.

The Confession was adopted by James VI, enjoined on persons of all ranks and classes, and re-affirmed in 1590, then in 1596. However, James argued that as king he was also head of the church, governing through bishops appointed by himself; very simply, 'No bishops, no king.' The alternative view was best expressed by Andrew Melville as "...Thair is twa Kings and twa Kingdomes in Scotland... Chryst Jesus the King and this Kingdome the Kirk, whose subject King James the Saxt is"; the kirk was subject only to God, and its members, including James, ruled by presbyteries, consisting of ministers and elders.

Although James successfully imposed bishops on the kirk, it remained Calvinist in doctrine; when he also became king of England in 1603, he saw a unified Church as the first step in creating a centralised, Unionist state. Although both Churches were nominally Episcopalian in structure and Protestant in doctrine, even Scottish bishops rejected many Church of England practises as little better than Catholic.

Opposition to Catholicism remained widespread in Scotland, even though by 1630 Catholicism was largely confined to the aristocracy and remote, Gaelic-speaking areas of the Highlands and Islands. Many Scots fought in the Thirty Years' War, one of the most destructive religious conflicts in European history, while there were close links with the Protestant Dutch Republic, then fighting for independence from Catholic Spain. Lastly, the majority of kirk ministers had been educated in French Calvinist universities, most of which were suppressed in the 1620s.

The result was a general perception that Protestant Europe was under attack and increased sensitivity to changes in church practice. In 1636, the Scots Church replaced Knox's Book of Discipline with the Book of Canons, and excommunicated anyone who denied the King's supremacy in church matters. When this was followed by a new Book of Common Prayer in 1637, it caused anger and widespread rioting. Traditionally, the riots were sparked when Jenny Geddes threw a stool at the minister during a service in St Giles Cathedral. More recently, historians like Mark Kishlansky have argued her protest was part of a series of planned and co-ordinated acts of opposition to the Book of Common Prayer, whose origin was as much political as it was religious.

Wars of the Three Kingdoms

Supervised by Archibald Johnston and Alexander Henderson, in February 1638 representatives from all sections of Scottish society agreed to a National Covenant, pledging resistance to liturgical 'innovations.' An important factor in the political contest with Charles was the Covenanter belief they were preserving an established and divinely ordained form of religion which he was seeking to alter. Debate as to what that meant persisted until finally settled in 1690. For example, the Covenant made no reference to bishops; Murdoch MacKenzie, Bishop of Orkney from 1677 to 1688, viewed himself as a Covenanter and argued their expulsion interfered with that form. Nevertheless, when the General Assembly of the Church of Scotland met in Glasgow in December 1638, it abolished episcopacy and affirmed its right to meet annually.

Support was widespread except in Aberdeenshire and Banff, heartland of Royalist and Episcopalian resistance for the next 60 years. The Marquess of Argyll and six other members of the Scottish Privy Council had backed the Covenant; Charles tried to impose his authority in the 1639 and 1640 Bishop's Wars, with his defeat leaving the Covenanters in control of Scotland. When the First English Civil War began in 1642, the Scots remained neutral at first but sent troops to Ulster to support their co-religionists in the Irish Rebellion; the bitterness of this conflict radicalised views in Scotland and Ireland.

Since Calvinists believed a 'well-ordered' monarchy was part of God's plan, the Covenanters committed to "defend the king's person and authority with our goods, bodies, and lives". The idea of government without a king was inconceivable. This view was generally shared by English Parliamentarians, who wanted to control Charles, not remove him, but both they and their Royalist opponents were further divided over religious doctrine. In Scotland, near unanimous agreement on doctrine meant differences centred on who held ultimate authority in clerical affairs. Royalists tended to be 'traditionalist' in religion and politics but there were various factors, including nationalist allegiance to the kirk. Individual motives were very complex, and many fought on both sides, including Montrose, a Covenanter general in 1639 and 1640 who nearly restored Royalist rule in Scotland in 1645.

The Covenanter faction led by Argyll saw religious union with England as the best way to preserve a Presbyterian Kirk and in October 1643, the Solemn League and Covenant agreed a Presbyterian Union in return for Scottish military support. Royalists and moderates in both Scotland and England opposed this on nationalist grounds, while religious Independents like Oliver Cromwell claimed he would fight, rather than agree to it.

The Covenanters and their English Presbyterian allies gradually came to see the Independents who dominated the New Model Army as a bigger threat than the Royalists and when Charles surrendered in 1646, they began negotiations to restore him to the English throne. In December 1647, Charles agreed to impose Presbyterianism in England for three years and suppress the Independents but his refusal to take the Covenant himself split the Covenanters into Engagers and Kirk Party fundamentalists or Whiggamores. Defeat in the Second English Civil War resulted in the execution of Charles in January 1649 and the Kirk Party taking control of the General Assembly.

In February 1649, the Scots proclaimed Charles II King of Scotland and Great Britain; under the terms of the Treaty of Breda, the Kirk Party agreed to restore Charles to the English throne and in return he accepted the Covenant. Defeats at Dunbar and Worcester resulted with Scotland being incorporated into the Commonwealth of England, Scotland and Ireland in 1652.

Under the Commonwealth

After defeat in 1651, the Covenanters split into two factions. Over two-thirds of the ministry supported the Resolution of December 1650 re-admitting Royalists and Engagers and were known as 'Resolutioners.' 'Protestors' were largely former Kirk Party fundamentalists or Whiggamores who blamed defeat on compromise with 'malignants.' Differences between the two were both religious and political, including church government, religious toleration and the role of law in a godly society.

Following the events of 1648–51, Cromwell decided the only way forward was to eliminate the power of the Scottish landed elite and the kirk. The Terms of Incorporation published on 12 February 1652 made a new Council of Scotland responsible for regulating church affairs and allowed freedom of worship for all Protestant sects. Since Presbyterianism was no longer the state religion, kirk sessions and synods functioned as before but its edicts were not enforced by civil penalties.

Covenanters were hostile to sects like the Congregationalists or Quakers because they advocated separation of church and state. Apart from a small number of Protestors known as Separatists, the vast majority refused to accept these changes, and Scotland was incorporated into the Commonwealth without further consultation on 21 April 1652.

Contests for control of individual presbyteries made the split increasingly bitter and in July 1653 each faction held its own General Assembly in Edinburgh. Robert Lilburne, English military commander in Scotland, used the excuse of Resolutioner church services praying for the success of Glencairn's rising to dissolve both sessions. The Assembly would not formally reconvene until 1690, the Resolutioner majority instead meeting in informal 'Consultations' and Protestors holding field assemblies or conventicles outside Resolutioner-controlled kirk structures.

When the Protectorate was established in 1654, Lord Broghill, head of the Council of State for Scotland summarised his dilemma; 'the Resolutioners love Charles Stuart and hate us, while the Protesters love neither him nor us.' Neither side was willing to co-operate with the Protectorate except in Glasgow, where Protestors led by Patrick Gillespie used the authorities in their contest with local Resolutioners.

Since the Resolutioners controlled 750 of 900 parishes, Broghill recognised they could not be ignored; his policy was to isolate the 'extreme' elements of both factions, hoping to create a new, moderate majority. He therefore encouraged internal divisions within the kirk, including appointing Gillespie Principal of the University of Glasgow, against the wishes of the James Guthrie and Warriston-led Protestor majority. The Protectorate authorities effectively became arbitrators between the factions, each of whom appointed representatives to argue their case in London; the repercussions affected the kirk for decades to come.

Restoration settlement

After the Restoration of the Monarchy in 1660, Scotland regained control of the kirk, but the Rescissory Act 1661 restored the legal position of 1633 and removing the Covenanter reforms of 1638–1639. The Privy Council of Scotland restored bishops on 6 September 1661. James Sharp, leader of the Resolutioners, became Archbishop of St Andrews; Robert Leighton was consecrated Bishop of Dunblane, and soon an entire bench of bishops had been appointed.

In 1662, the kirk was restored as the national church, independent sects banned and all office-holders required to renounce the 1638 Covenant; about a third, or around 270 in total, refused to do so and lost their positions as a result. Most occurred in the south-west of Scotland, an area particularly strong in its Covenanting sympathies; the practice of holding conventicles outside the formal structure continued, often attracting thousands of worshippers.

The government alternated between persecution and toleration; in 1663, dissenting ministers were declared 'seditious persons' and imposed heavy fines on those who failed to attend the parish churches of the "King's curates". In 1666 a group of men from Galloway captured the local military commander, marched on Edinburgh and were defeated at the Battle of Rullion Green. Around 50 prisoners were taken, while a number of others were arrested; 33 were executed and the rest transported to Barbados.

The Rising led to the replacement of the Duke of Rothes as King's Commissioner by John Maitland, 1st Duke of Lauderdale who followed a more conciliatory policy. Letters of Indulgence were issued in 1669, 1672 and 1679, allowing evicted ministers to return to their parishes, if they agreed to avoid politics. A number returned but over 150 refused the offer, while many Episcopalians were alienated by the compromise.

The outcome was a return to persecution; preaching at a conventicle was made punishable by death, while attendance attracted severe sanctions. In 1674, heritors and masters were made responsible for the 'good behaviour' of their tenants and servants; from 1677, this meant posting bonds for those living on their land. In 1678, 3,000 Lowland militia and 6,000 Highlanders, known as the "Highland Host", were billeted in the Covenanting shires, especially those in the South-West, as a form of punishment.

1679 Rebellion and the Killing Time

The assassination of Archbishop Sharp by Covenanter radicals in May 1679 led to a revolt that ended at the Battle of Bothwell Bridge in June. Although battlefield casualties were relatively few, over 1,200 prisoners were sentenced to transportation, the chief prosecutor being Lord Advocate Rosehaugh. Claims of undocumented, indiscriminate killing in the aftermath of the battle have also been made.

Defeat split the movement into moderates and extremists, the latter headed by Donald Cargill and Richard Cameron who issued the Sanquhar Declaration in June 1680. While Covenanters previously claimed to object only to state religious policy, this renounced any allegiance to either Charles, or his Catholic brother James. Adherents were known as Cameronians, and although a relatively small minority, the deaths of Cameron, his brother and Cargill gained them considerable sympathy.

The 1681 Scottish Succession and Test Acts made obedience to the monarch a legal obligation, 'regardless of religion', but in return confirmed the primacy of the kirk "as currently constituted". This excluded the Covenanters, who wanted to restore it to the structure prevailing in 1640. A number of government figures, including James Dalrymple, chief legal officer, and Archibald Campbell, 9th Earl of Argyll, objected to inconsistencies in the Act and refused to swear. Argyll was convicted of treason and sentenced to death, although he and Dalrymple escaped to the Dutch Republic.

The Cameronians were now organised more formally as the 'United Societies'; estimates of their numbers vary from 6,000 to 7,000, mostly concentrated in Argyllshire. Led by James Renwick, in 1684 copies of an Apologetical Declaration were posted in different locations, effectively declaring war on government officers. This led to the period known in Protestant historiography as "the Killing Time"; the Scottish Privy Council authorised the extrajudicial execution of any Covenanters caught in arms, policies carried out by troops under John Graham, 1st Viscount Dundee. At the same time, Lord Rosehaugh adopted the French practice of same day trial and execution for militants who refused to swear oaths of loyalty to the king.

Despite his Catholicism, James VII became king in April 1685 with widespread support, largely due to fears of civil war if he were bypassed, and opposition to re-opening past divisions within the kirk. These factors contributed to the rapid defeat of Argyll's Rising in June 1685; in a bid to widen its appeal, his manifesto omitted any mention of the 1638 Covenant. Renwick and his followers refused to support it as a result.

The Glorious Revolution and the 1690 Settlement

A major factor in the defeat of Argyll's Rising was the desire for stability within the kirk. By issuing Letters of Indulgence to dissident Presbyterians in 1687, James now threatened to re-open this debate and undermine his own Episcopalian base. At the same time, he excluded the Society People, and created another Covenanter martyr with the execution of Renwick in February 1688.

In June 1688, two events turned dissent into a crisis: the birth of James Francis Edward on 10 June created a Catholic heir, excluding James' Protestant daughter Mary and her husband William of Orange. Prosecuting the Seven Bishops seemed to go beyond tolerance for Catholicism and into an assault on the Episcopalian establishment; their acquittal on 30 June destroyed James' political authority. Representatives from the English political class invited William to assume the English throne; when he landed in Brixham on 5 November, James' army deserted him and he left for France on 23 December.

The Scottish Convention elected in March to determine settlement of the Scottish throne was dominated by Covenanter sympathisers. On 4 April, it passed the Claim of Right and the 'Articles of Grievances', which held James forfeited the Crown by his actions; on 11 May, William and Mary became co-monarchs of Scotland. Although William wanted to retain bishops, the role played by Covenanters during the Jacobite rising of 1689, including the Cameronians' defence of Dunkeld in August, meant their views prevailed in the political settlement that followed. The General Assembly met in November 1690 for the first time since 1654; even before it convened, over 200 Episcopalian ministers had been removed from their livings.

The Assembly once again eliminated episcopacy and created two commissions for the south and north of the Tay, which over the next 25 years removed almost two-thirds of all ministers. To offset this, nearly one hundred clergy returned to the kirk in the 1693 and 1695 Acts of Indulgence, while others were protected by the local gentry and retained their positions until death by natural causes.

Following the 1690 Settlement, a small minority of the United Societies followed Cameronian leader Robert Hamilton in refusing to re-enter the kirk. They continued as an informal grouping until 1706, when John M'Millan was appointed minister; in 1743, he and Thomas Nairn set up the Reformed Presbyterian Church of Scotland. Although the church still exists, the vast majority of its members joined the Free Church of Scotland in 1876.

Legacy

Memorials

Covenanter graves and memorials from the 'Killing Time' became important in perpetuating a political message, initially by the small minority of the United Societies who remained outside the kirk. In 1701, their Assembly undertook to recover or mark the graves of the dead; many were to be found in remote places, as the government of the time deliberately sought to avoid creating places of pilgrimage.

'Old Mortality', an 1816 novel by Sir Walter Scott, features a character who spends his time travelling around Scotland, renewing inscriptions on Covenanter graves. In 1966, the Scottish Covenanter Memorial Association was established, which maintains these monuments throughout Scotland. One of the most famous is that erected at Greyfriars Kirkyard in 1707, commemorating 18,000 martyrs killed from 1661 to 1680.

In 1721 and 1722, Robert Wodrow published The History of the Sufferings of the Church of Scotland from the Restoration to the Revolution, detailing the persecution of the Covenanter movement from 1660 to 1690. This work would be brought forward again when elements in the Church of Scotland felt it to be suffering state interference, as at the Disruption of 1843.

Covenanters in North America

Throughout the 17th century, Covenanter congregations were established in Ireland, primarily in Ulster; for a variety of reasons, many subsequently migrated to North America. In 1717, William Tennent moved with his family to Philadelphia, where he later founded Log College, the first Presbyterian seminary in North America.

In North America, many former Covenanters joined the Reformed Presbyterian Church of North America, which was founded in 1743.

See also
 Presbyterianism
 Calvinism
 Cameronians
 Reformed Presbyterian Global Alliance
 Solemn League and Covenant
 Free Presbyterian Church of Scotland

Notes

References

Sources

Bibliography
Buckroyd, J. Church and State in Scotland, 1660-1681. 1980
Cowan, E. J.  The Solemn League and Covenant, in Scotland and England, 1286–1815, ed. R. A. Mason, 1987.
Cowan, I. B. The Covenanters: a Revision Article'''' in The Scottish Historical Review, vol. 28, pp43–54, 1949.
Cowan, I. B. The Scottish Covenanters, 1660-1688, 1976
Donaldson, G. Scotland from James V to James VII, 1965
Fissel, M. C. The Bishops' Wars. Charles I's Campaigns against Scotland, 1638-1640, 1994

Kiernan, V. G. A Banner with a Strange Device: the Later Covenanters, in History from Below, ed. K. Frantz, 1988.

Love, Dane. Scottish Kirkyards, 1989 (Robert Hale Publishers, London).

Paterson, R C. A Land Afflicted, Scotland And The Covenanter Wars, 1638-1690, 1998
Purves, Jock. Fair Sunshine. 1968
Purves, Jock. Sweet Believing. Stirling, 1954
Scott, Sir Walter. The Tale Of Old Mortality, 1816.
Stevenson, D. The Scottish Revolution, 1637–1644,'' 1973.

External links
Who were the Covenanters? Scottish Covenanter Memorials Association
The Reformed Presbyterian Church in North America
The Reformed Presbyterian Church (Covenanted)
Edinburgh's History: The Covenanters
The Reformed Presbytery in North America
British Civil Wars: The Scottish National Covenant
British Civil Wars: The Covenanters
The History of Protestantism - Volume Third - Book Twenty-fourth - Protestantism In Scotland
The Covenants And The Covenanters, 1895, from Project Gutenberg
The signing of the national covenant-1638/
 A Poetic Sketch by Letitia Elizabeth Landon in the Literary gazette, 1823.

 
Presbyterianism in Scotland
Scottish Reformation
17th century in Scotland
17th-century Calvinism